Lake Ardibbo is a freshwater lake of Ethiopia. It is located north of Dessie, in the Debub Wollo Zone of the Amhara Region. It is situated about five kilometers southeast of Lake Hayq; both lakes are in Tehuledere woreda.

This lake is smaller in size than Lake Hayq and flows into Hayq via the Anchercah River.

References

Amhara Region
Lakes of Ethiopia
Mountain lakes